Maurice Murphy (October 3, 1913 – November 23, 1978) was an American film actor. Initially a child actor, he graduated to playing older roles, often in action films. His brother Jack Murphy also became an actor. 

Early film appearances included in Stella Dallas and as the young Beau Geste in the 1926 film. In 1934 he played the title role in the Universal Pictures serial Tailspin Tommy.

Filmography

References

Bibliography
 Michael R. Pitts. Poverty Row Studios, 1929–1940: An Illustrated History of 55 Independent Film Companies, with a Filmography for Each. McFarland & Company, 2005.

External links

1913 births
1978 deaths
20th-century American male actors
American male child actors
American male film actors
People from Seattle